The Comeback is a 2015 Filipino independent comedy film. It was nominated for Best Film, Best Actress, and Best Director in the 2015 Cinema One Originals Film Festival, but failed to win any awards.

Plot
The story follows a 32-year-old formerly famous actress who loses everything in her life and decides to commit suicide. On the day she decides to kill herself, she receives a package containing four letters and a dead man's ashes.

Cast
Kaye Abad as Angela
Sheena Ramos as Beng
Valeen Montenegro as Aurora
Matt Evans
Patrick Garcia
Maria Isabel Lopez

Reception
Writing in the Philippine Daily Inquirer, entertainment editor Rito P. Asilo remarked on the "riotous ludicrousness" of this "wacky comedy" that "fail[s] to say anything significant", while an ABS-CBN reviewer focused on the quality of the lead's acting, saying that "Kaye Abad shines in her role as Angela Velasco".

References

External links
 
http://www.philippineedition.com/2015/11/movie-kaye-abads-comeback-2015-cinema.html
http://www.philstar.com/entertainment/2015/11/06/1519024/list-cinema-one-originals-2015-competing-films

Filipino-language films
Philippine comedy films
2015 films
Films set in the Philippines
Films directed by Ivan Andrew Payawal